The Bonthain rat or southwestern xanthurus rat (Rattus bontanus) is a species of rodent in the family Muridae.
It is found only in southwestern Sulawesi, Indonesia.

References

Rattus
Rats of Asia
Endemic fauna of Indonesia
Rodents of Sulawesi
Vulnerable fauna of Asia
Mammals described in 1921
Taxa named by Oldfield Thomas
Taxonomy articles created by Polbot